Carencro is the major label debut of Louisiana musician Marc Broussard. The album was released by Island Records on August 3, 2004. The album title pays tribute to the musician's hometown of Carencro, Louisiana.

The album's first single, "Home", received airplay during the initial album release, and also after Hurricane Katrina. The song's music video, showing masses of people stuck in a traffic jam on the highway, seemed appropriate to depict displaced people fleeing New Orleans.

The track "Gavin's Song" was written for Broussard's son, Gavin.

Track listing 
"Home" (Marc Broussard, Shannon Sanders, Marshall Altman, Ted Broussard, and Andrew Ramsey)
"Rocksteady" (Broussard, Jeff Trott, Mike Elizondo, and David Ryan Harris)
"Beauty of Who You Are" (Broussard, Radney Foster, and Justin Tocket)
"Save Me" (Marc Broussard and Jay Joyce)
"Come Around" (Broussard and Harris)
"Where You Are" (Broussard, Altman, and Angelo)
"Lonely Night in Georgia" (Broussard, Dave Barnes, and Martin Sexton)
"Saturday" (Marc Broussard, Ty Smith, and Ramsey)
"The Wanderer" (Broussard and Altman)
"Hope For Me Yet" (Broussard, Foster, Tocket)
"Let Me Leave" (Broussard and Altman)
"Gavin's Song" (Hidden Bonus Track)

Personnel
 Marshall Altman - Fender Rhodes, moog synthesizer, programming, string arrangements, toy piano, background vocals
 Bayou Bruce Steppers & Entourage - clapping
 Glen Berger - flute, tenor saxophone, baritone saxophone
 Brothers William - background vocals
 Marc Broussard - acoustic guitar, lead vocals
 Ted Broussard - acoustic guitar
 Carencro Symphony Orchestra Gospel Choir - background vocals
 Lenny Castro - percussion, shaker, triangle, washboard
 Julian Coryell - banjo, electric guitar, keyboards, background vocals
 David Egan - organ
 Chad Gilmore - drums
 Sonny Landreth - slide guitar
 Jim McGorman - Fender Rhodes, organ, piano, Wurlitzer, background vocals
 Dino Meneghin - electric guitar, soloist
 Shannon Sanders - programming
 Kevin Stevens - percussion
 Lee Thornburg - trumpet
 Calvin Turner - bass guitar, trombone, horn arrangements
 Joe Zook - 12-string bass guitar, electric guitar, percussion, tambourine, recording engineer and mixer

Singles 
"Home" was the album's lead single. It was originally just sent out to pop radio stations, but it crossed over into country radio, with the video eventually being added to Country Music Television (CMT).

"Where You Are" served as the second single. The music video received substantial airplay on VH1.

References

2004 albums
Marc Broussard albums
Island Records albums